The following is a list of characters from the Yu-Gi-Oh! anime series, Yu-Gi-Oh! VRAINS.

Characters

Main Characters
 /  

He’s the main protagonist of the series; he is a calm and intelligent 16-year-old high school student. He is secretly working as a hacker and prefers not to stand out in his environment or socializing with others for this reason. As Playmaker, he fought against the Knights of Hanoi to uncover the truth of his past. Ten years before the story, he was kidnapped along with five other children, including Jin, Specter, Theodore, and Miyu. He was imprisoned in a room and forced to duel and win to get nourishment. During those times, he was encouraged by Varis who told him to think of three reasons to live, which made Yusaku develop the habit to state three reasons behind his actions in the present day. He was rescued half a year later, but the incident deeply scarred him. Wanting to put his past behind him, Yusaku became determined to uncover the truth behind his kidnapping. He captured Ai at the beginning of the series and held him hostage during his battles against the Hanoi. In the second season, three months after he defeated Varis and saved LINK VRAINS, however, Queen put a bounty on him despite his heroic actions, as Ai returned to his possession despite Yusaku having freed him prior. Learning that Jin's stolen consciousness was connected to the destruction of Cyberse World, Yusaku became determined to stop the war between humanity and the Ignis; teaming up with Akira Zaizen, Skye, Emma, and the Hanoi. He defeated Bohman and saved humanity, plus everyone was revived. SOL Technologies removed the bounty on him after Ai defeated Queen, he unwillingly fought against his own ally Ai to save SOL Technologies. After he defeated Ai, he went to on a journey in the Network. Why Playmaker went on a journey and what it was for wasn’t made clear.

He uses a Cyberse Deck that focuses on Link Summoning with his ace monsters being Decode Talker and Firewall Dragon; he once used a Warrior Deck before obtaining his Cyberse Deck. In Season 2, he mastered Ritual, Fusion, Synchro and Xyz Summoning with Cyberse Magician, Cyberse Clock Dragon, Cyberse Quantum Dragon, and Firewall eXceed Dragon. He evolved his Firewall Dragon into Link-5 Firewall Dragon Darkfluid. Yusaku’s skill is Storm Access, when his life points are 1,000 or lower, Yusaku can add 1 random Link Monster from a Data Storm to his extra deck. In season 2 Ai created a new Skill called Neo Storm Access. Just like Storm Access, Yusaku has to have 1,000 life points or lower, but now, he can add any random  monster from the Data Storm to his extra deck, not just Link Monsters. Another feature of Neo Storm Access, is that if Yusaku didn’t add a monster from the Data Storm to his extra deck, if he has 100 life points or less he can add any random monster from the Data Storm to his extra deck and then he can draw 1 card. When Ai became the main antagonist for season 3, it was unknown if Yusaku lost the ability to use Neo Storm Access.

He was sought by both SOL Technologies and the Knights of Hanoi. Five years before the story, when the Knights of Hanoi nearly destroyed Cyberse, the world he came from, Ai sealed his own world to save it from destruction at the cost of being unable to return to Cyberse. In the process, he was devoured by Cracking Dragon, causing him to lose the majority of his memories. In his escape attempt, Yusaku trapped him inside his Duel Disk to use him as leverage against the Knights of Hanoi. After capturing him, Yusaku names him "Ai" as a pun on how he was an AI program and how he was an eyeball at the time. It was later revealed that he was actually created ten years ago by Dr. Kogami during the Lost Incident, and that he was based on Yusaku. His story about losing his memories was a lie as to prevent Yusaku questioning him. After Varis was defeated, Ai returned to the Cyberse World, only to find it destroyed, which led him to return to Yusaku's side and once again work alongside Playmaker after learning the destruction of Cyberse World and Jin's stolen consciousness were connected. He freed himself from Playmaker’s Duel Disk and sacrificed himself, but returned thanks to the backup he put in Roboppy. 
In Season 3, however, he became the main antagonist, he dueled and won against Queen, and put her in the hospital for Earth's sakes. Since he now has the code key, he now takes control of SOL Technologies. Because of Lightning, he unwillingly turned his back on humanity, dragged Roboppy down with him, and betrayed Playmaker’s faction. He now has a human form and he uses an @Ignister deck, which is modeled after his fallen comrades. After losing Roboppy to Soulburner, he created android copies of himself thanks to the factory own by SOL Technologies, under his control. He enhanced Bohman’s programming and obtained a Link 6 Monster. He was seemingly deleted, but it was revealed that Ai is still alive in the final episode.
In season 3 Ai uses the @Ignister archetype. He tends to summon lots of monsters through spell cards and monster effects. For spells and traps, he uses the "A.I." archetype. He usually summons his Link Monsters very quickly. Each @Ignister monster represents him and his fellow Ignis. Doyon @Ignister and Dark Templar @Ignister represents Ai himself. Achichi @Ignister and Fire Phoenix @Ignister represents Flame. Hayari @Ignister and Water Leviathan @Ignister represent Aqua. Doshin @Ignister and Earth Golem @Ignister represents Earth. Bururu @Ignister and Wind Pegasus @Ignister represents Windy. And Pikari @Ignister and Light Dragon @Ignister represents Lighting. Ai's most powerful card The Arrival @Ignister represents the combined power of all of the Ignis.

 /  /  / 

She’s the series' main heroine and one of Yusaku's classmates, and a member of the duel club. As Blue Angel, she was a Celebrity Duelist, and a popular duel idol. While she appears cool on the outside as Blue Angel, her personality drastically changed to be more active. She is the younger step-sister of Akira Zaizen, the head of security of SOL Technologies. As Akira rarely came home from work, Skye became determined to use her career as a Celebrity Duelist to gain recognition from Akira. After being Deleted during a duel with Playmaker, Skye realized how much her step-brother cared for her, and she was torn between following her step-brother's request to never enter LINK VRAINS and her own wish to continue duel. After being provoked by Emma, Skye decided to enter LINK VRAINS again and managed to defeat Baira, gaining Akira's recognition by freeing the Deleted, but was defeated by Specter. In the second season, she became Ghost Gal's partner in investigating the Ignis. Skye created a new avatar named Blue Gal that she used whenever she was on missions with Ghost Gal. She joined Playmaker's side in the Ignis War to stop Lightning's plans; saving Aqua from Shepherd. She has a childhood friend named Miyu, who she met ten years prior to the series. She learned that Lightning infected Miyu with a computer virus and put her in a coma. After teaming up with Aqua, she changed her avatar again to Blue Maiden. She fought to save Miyu. She uses a Trickstar Deck that focuses on Link Summoning and effect damage. After Playmaker defeated Bohman, she was revived. She visited Miyu in the hospital. Her ace monster is Trickstar Holly Angel. In Season 2, she mastered Fusion Summoning.
In Season 3, she learned that Playmaker’s identity is Yusaku Fujiki. She occasionally visits Cal Kolter’s food truck and later check his brother Jin out. As Blue Maiden, she now uses a Marincess deck created by Aqua.

 

He was a famous Celebrity Duelist. He was raised in an orphanage when he was little, so he worked hard as a Celebrity Duelist to repay his debt to the orphanage. Gore was admired by the children of the orphanage until Playmaker gained their admiration following his victory against a Knight of Hanoi. Since then, Gore considered Playmaker his rival. To regain the hearts of his fans, The Gore lured Playmaker into a trap and dueled him. Although he lost, his dueling managed to win back the hearts of the children from the orphanage. He joined Playmaker in battling the Knights of Hanoi; defeating Dr. Genome after Genome attacked one of his friends and even challenging Varis, but he lost. In the second season, he threw away his reputation as a Celebrity Duelist, and became a bounty hunter to hunt down Playmaker for SOL Technologies, as he wishes to regain his former glory. He gave his Gouki deck to Kenji and Yozaka. He served as an antagonist after going through experimentation under Queen, defeating Earth and having his data implanted inside his brain. He returned to his normal self sometime after his 2nd duel with Playmaker, he almost realized what kind of abomination that he become because of the experimentation. He was erased after losing to Ai. After Playmaker defeated Ai, he was revived and did manage return to his former glory.
After becoming a bounty hunter, he uses a Dinowrestler Deck, and he mastered Fusion and Synchro Summoning; his new ace monsters are Dinowrestler King T Wrextle, Dinowrestler Chimera T Wrextle and Dinowrestler Giga Spinosavate.

 /  

He’s a mysterious Duelist who first appeared alongside the fire Ignis, Flame, while watching the Duel between Playmaker and Bohman. When Playmaker was blocked by Bit and Boot while pursuing Bohman and Harlin, Soulburner interfered by challenging them in Playmaker's place. He was also a victim of the Lost Incident. As the result of the incident that also inadvertently caused his parents' death, Theodore detached himself from others except his grandparents and his friend Kiku, constantly skipping school. The incident also caused Theodore to swear to never Duel again until he met Flame and learned everything about Lost Incident. Deciding to confront his life, he befriended Yusaku and Kolter, and joined their cause. While Takeru was able to duel again, he had immense fear of the Despair from the Dark card that repeatedly defeated him during his time in captivity. He was eventually able to overcome his trauma through Flame's encouragement. After Playmaker defeated Bohman, he was revived. He uses a Salamangreat Deck and his ace monster is Salamangreat Heatleo. After Playmaker defeated Ai, he returns to his hometown and introduce Kiku to the new LINK VRAINS. Theodore’s skill is called Burning Draw. If Theodore lowers his life points to 100, for every thousand he gave up, he can draw a card from his deck. When Flame was killed at the end of  season 2, it’s unknown if Theodore lost the ability to use Burning Draw.

He was one of the six Ignis; the "Fire Ignis", and was currently in the possession of Theodore Hamilton whom he was based on. After the destruction of Cyberse World, Flame approached Theodore, encouraged him to confront his life, leading to their partnership, he was absorbed by Bohman along with Windy. After Bohman was defeated he was erased.

Knights of Hanoi
The  were a mysterious hacker group that hacks via Dueling inside LINK VRAINS to destroy the "AI World" known as "Cyberse" that exists somewhere in the depths of the Network. Their soldiers used DARK Machine decks and their ace monster was "Cracking Dragon".

 / 

He’s the leader of the Knights of Hanoi, he was the main antagonist of the first season and Playmaker's main rival. His goal was to destroy the "Cyberse". Varis was distrusting of the Internet, believing that it was merely a world of fiction, and was willing to destroy the Cyberse by any means. After Playmaker's third duel with Bohman, Varis became allies with Playmaker, though he wanted to duel Yusaku as Playmaker again and later apologized to Theodore as Soulburner because of his father's past actions.  After his duel with Lightning, he was erased. After Playmaker defeated Bohman, he was revived. Varis uses a Rokket Deck, and his ace monster is Borreload Dragon. In Season 2, he mastered Synchro and Xyz Summoning. In Season 3, he somehow mastered Fusion Summoning. After losing to Soulburner, he and his group decide to atone their crimes and sins in order to make a better future on their own.

He’s Varis' right-hand man; he was one of the six children who was kidnapped in the Lost Incident. Unlike the others, Specter enjoyed the time he spent during the captivity, feeling that he was being tested and needed by someone for bigger purpose. He was an orphan, abandoned ever since he was a baby. He had difficulty connecting with people, leaving him alone and bored with society until the Lost Incident occurred. After the incident ended, Specter felt lonelier when he was returned to the orphanage and decided to run away, going back to where he was being held captive. This led him being found by Varis who invited him to join Knights of Hanoi. Since then, Specter became unquestioningly loyal to Varis and will fulfill his wishes at all cost, even showing cruelty to whoever dare to defy the Hanoi. Despite being on opposing sides, Specter felt really bad for the death of Earth, his Ignis. When he was defeated by Lightning, he was erased. After Playmaker defeated Bohman, he was revived. He was erased after losing to a copy of Ai. After Playmaker defeated Ai, he was revived.
Specter uses Sunavalon/Sunvine Deck that focuses on restoring his LP.

He was the founder of the Knights of Hanoi, the creator of the Ignis, and Varis's father. Ten years before the story, he kidnapped six children for the purpose of a plan called the Hanoi Project, which led to the creation of the Ignis. Seven years before the story he apparently died, but his consciousness somehow still remained in LINK VRAINS with Roken taking care of his body in the real world. He died after Playmaker and Varis' third duel, just before his death, he entrusted his son to kill the Ignis he created, believing them a threat to humanity. It was later revealed that Lightning infected him.

He’s one of Varis's childhood friends, he is determined to follow him to the end, even if branded a criminal. After Genome and Baira lost and were purged, Aso kidnapped Shima whom he mistook as Playmaker's ally after he saw him using Cyberse Wizard and successfully lured Playmaker into dueling him. He lost and was also purged like Genome and Baira. After the end of the Tower of Hanoi, he recovered. He was erased after losing to a copy of Ai. After Playmaker defeated Ai, he was revived.
He uses a Motor Worm Deck and uses Motor Worm Spreader Queen as his ace card.

Clarissa Turner /  / 

She’s another of Varis's childhood friends, she and Aso started the plan of transforming duelists into Anothers to lure Playmaker. Unlike other most Knights of Hanoi, she has doubt in Kogami's plan and worries for the burden of the crime that Varis will carry if Kogami's plan is executed. She was then challenged by Blue Angel, and inspired by how Blue Angel never stops believing in herself, Baira decided to free all Deleted victims after she lost against Blue Angel. However, this caused her to be purged by Varis, after the downfall of the Hanoi, she was sent to prison, until Varis broke her out. She was erased after losing to a copy of Ai. After Playmaker defeated Ai, she was revived.
She uses a Virus Deck and uses Dark Mummy Surgical Forceps as her ace card.

Ten years before the present, Dr. Genome was one of Dr. Kogami's assistants who helped him plan and execute the Hanoi Project. Together with Kogami, Aso, and Clarissa Turner, he helped create the Ignis - six AI with free will based on the Lost Incident victims and the Duel Monsters attributes. When Lightning infected Dr. Kogami with a computer virus to cover up the Hanoi Project, he helped recreate his consciousness inside the network, faithfully serving as a Knight of Hanoi ever since. Genome uses a Helixx Deck. After losing to The Gore, he was purged by Varis, he recovered after the end of the Tower of Hanoi. He was erased after losing to a copy of Ai. After Playmaker defeated Ai, he was revived.

Voiced by: Kim Hyang-Ri (Japanese); Grace Choi (English)
An Anti-Ignis AI created by Varis. She can split herself into four copies that can share information with each other. Three of the copies were erased when The Gore, Ghost Gal and Shepherd were defeated. The last one was spared due to Ai sparing Blue Maiden to make her feel the same pain he has. Pandor plays a Topologina deck.

SOL Technologies
SOL Technologies is the company in charge of Link VRAINS. In season 2, SOL Technologies hires a group of bounty hunters led by Queen to hunt Playmaker and capture his Ignis. They manage to succeed in catching and dissecting the Earth Ignis due to the efforts of Gore. Later Shepherd discovered that Queen planned to capture all the Ignis and dissect them to create a new high performance Ignis. In season 3, Ai took over the company after defeating both Queen and Akira. He planned to use the SOLtis they created in order to make copies of himself. After Ai's downfall, Akira regain control of the company.

He was the Security Manager of SOL Technologies and Skye's older step-brother, who was after Ai in order to find the Cyberse world and save the company. He lived together with Skye but rarely came home due to his work. After Playmaker's Duel against Varis where he overheard of an incident that happened 10 years ago caused by SOL Technologies, Zaizen was demoted from his position and seeks to find out the truth. After the downfall of Hanoi, he got his original position back as Security Manager. He was forced to hire a bounty hunter team by Queen to capture Playmaker. He was once a Bounty Hunter who worked alongside Ghost Gal and Shepherd three years prior to the series. His consciousness was taken by Bohman, but he stopped the Neuron Link just after his consciousness was taken. After Playmaker defeated Bohman, he was revived.
In Season 3, he was promoted to Executive Director, he gathered an impressive roster of Duelists to protect him from Ai, he learned Playmaker’s identity is Yusaku Fujiki. He was erased after losing to Ai. After Playmaker defeated Ai, he was revived, 3 months later, he was promoted again to CEO.

She was a ruthless woman, the Vice-Chairwoman of SOL Technologies, one of the higher-ups at SOL Technologies, and Akira Zaizen's current boss. She put a bounty on Playmaker. She rehired Akira Zaizen as Security Manager and placed him in charge of assembling a bounty hunter team to capture Playmaker and the Ignis, Ai, she also served as an antagonist in Season 2. She had a similar goal as Lightning, to dissect all the Ignis to create a new, high performance Ignis. After losing to Ai, she was put in the hospital. Her fate remains unknown.

He is one of the higher-ups at SOL Technologies who communicates via a hologram of a bishop chess piece.

He is one of the higher-ups at SOL Technologies who communicates via a hologram of a knight chess piece.

He is one of the higher-ups at SOL Technologies who communicates via a hologram of a rook chess piece.

He was both Akira's former boss and replacement as Security Manager of SOL Technologies. He served as a minor antagonist, and he was in charge of the project to create an army of AI Duelists to protect LINK VRAINS from hackers. He constantly threatened to fire his employees and cut their salaries the moment something went wrong much to their confusion and exasperation. He was man without principles who surged his people for power. He was easily defeated by Specter and absorbed into the Tower of Hanoi.

Risa 

She’s Akira Zaizen's co-worker who has a crush on him. Has worked for SOL for three years. She still works alongside Akira Zaizen when he got his position as manager back by Queen, the Vice-Chairwoman who put a bounty on Playmaker. She still supports him 3 months later after Ai's downfall.

Den City

He’s a hacker and Yusaku's ally who helped him in his fight against the Knights of Hanoi in order to save his younger brother, Jin, who was also a victim of the Lost Incident ten years ago. It was suggested that he knew something about a mysterious group of people who used to ride the Data Storm and who seemed to have recognized the Data Storm when Ai manifests one, he was erased after losing to Playmaker. After Playmaker defeated Bohman, he was revived. His brother Jin now works at his food truck.

 / Ghost Gal / 

She’s a Cyber Treasure Hunter who steals information and sells it for profit. She accepted jobs from anyone, most frequently Zaizen or SOL Technologies, as long as she received high payment for her service. Getting curious of SOL Technologies and Ignis, Emma challenged Playmaker to a Duel by using the backdoor of SOL Tech's databank as the prize if he won against her. When she lost, she decided to team up with Zaizen to infiltrate SOL Technologies with Playmaker as distraction. Despite stating she only worked for someone who can pay her, she still often helps Zaizen and Skye. After losing to Varis, she was the first victim to be absorbed into the Tower of Hanoi. She was revived when Playmaker defeated Varis and saved LINK VRAINS. In the second season, she was offered a job as bounty hunter to pursue Playmaker, but she refused as she owed Playmaker her life. She was a mercenary who worked alongside Akira Zaizen and Shepherd three years prior to the series, also learning that Shepard is her older half-brother. Her consciousness was taken by Bohman. After Playmaker defeated Bohman, she was revived. She and Shepherd both dueled Roboppy, But they were both beaten by him and were erased soon after. After Playmaker defeated Ai, she was revived.
She uses an Altergeist Deck and her ace monster is Altergeist Primebanshee. In Season 2, she mastered Synchro Summoning.

 / 

He’s Yusaku's classmate and a fan of Playmaker. Despite liking Duel Monsters and owning the latest Duel Disk, Shima has little to no confidence in his own skill and never enters LINK VRAINS. He was also in the same Dueling Club as Skye. When Knights of Hanoi went on rampage in LINK VRAINS, Shima received a portion of card data of Cyberse Wizard and mistook the card being given by Playmaker. That finally pushed him to enter LINK VRAINS under the username "Lonely Brave" and managed to defeat a Knight of Hanoi using Cyberse Wizard. Becoming overly confident, he changed his username to "Brave Battler”. He was then kidnapped by Aso, which successfully lured Playmaker. He was saved after Playmaker defeated Aso and was inspired to make his own path after receiving words of encouragement from Playmaker. His consciousness was taken by Bohman to create a Neuron Link. After Playmaker defeated Bohman, he was revived. He uses a Baboon deck.

 and 
Frog 
Pigeon 
They’re a pair of LINK VRAINS reporters who are trying to search for scoops about Playmaker. When they interviewed Brave Battler and made videos of him, they didn't do so well, because of that, they were done with him. They installed a rocket to catch up with Playmaker, but when they passed him, they crashed, but they survived. Later, they were captured by Varis for eavesdropping. Luckily Specter let them go, but they were captured again by Windy, and they were forced to work for Lightning. After Bohman absorbed Windy and Lightning, they decided to see the final moments of Bohman till to the end. After Playmaker defeated Bohman, they were revived.

He’s the younger brother of Kolter and one of the victims of the Hanoi Project. After the Lost Incident, he was traumatized by Lightning. His consciousness was currently locked inside LINK VRAINS under Lightning's control as a puppet, Lightning freed him from his control and used him as a hostage to hesitate Varis. After the duel between Varis and Lightning, he was erased. After Playmaker defeated Bohman, he was revived. Now he works at Cal Kolter’s food truck.

She’s Skye Zaizen's childhood friend and one of the victims of the Hanoi Project. She was in a coma due to a computer virus that Lightning infected her with. After Playmaker defeated Bohman, she awoke from her coma.

 / Shepherd / 

A bounty hunter known for his ruthless nature to hunt his prey by any means necessary. He is hired by SOL Technologies to hunt down Playmaker and capture his Ignis. He holds hatred against AI which stems from a car accident that damaged his right arm to the point where it was unusable and paralyzed his mother's spine. Kenneth is also the half brother of Emma Bessho due to both of them sharing the same father who he resents for abandoning him and his mother for another family. After discovering SOL Tech's true reasons for wanting the Ignis, Shepherd quit working for them and set off on his own to hunt the Ignis. He came across Lightning and challenged him to a duel but he was defeated and erased. Shepherd returned after Bohman was defeated. Later Shepherd was summoned to protect Akira to prevent Ai from stealing his code key. He and Ghost Gal dueled Roboppy but they were both beaten by him and were erased soon after. Shepherd returned to normal after Ai was defeated and is last seen working together with his sister. Shepherd uses a Drone deck.

 
 Voiced by: Miyu Shimabukuro (Japanese); Ashley Eileen Bucknam (English)
She is Theodore's friend from his grandparents town.

Ignis
AI with free will created by Dr. Kogami through the Hanoi Project.

He was one of the six Ignis, the "Wind Ignis". He was defeated by Varis and infected with a virus, when he recovered, he looked horrible, when he was defeated by Soulburner, he was incinerated by Lightning, his Data was transferred into Flame. He and Flame have been absorbed by Bohman. It was later revealed that he had no evil personality and that he had the chance to co-exist with humanity, until Lightning manipulated him. He was nothing but a pawn to Lightning. After Bohman was defeated, he was erased. He uses a Stormrider deck that focuses on Field Spells and controlling no cards in his Spell & Trap Zones.

He was one of the six Ignis, the "Earth Ignis", who was based on Specter. He had feelings for Aqua, when he was beaten by The Gore, he was captured, and then he was dissected by Queen. His data was implanted inside The Gore, and his monster G Golem Crystal Heart was corrupted. After Playmaker's second duel with The Gore, Ai retrieved G Golem Crystal Heart and gave it back to Aqua. He and Aqua were both absorbed by Bohman. After Bohman was defeated, he was erased. He uses a G Golem deck focused on protecting Crystal Heart.

She was one of the six Ignis, the "Water Ignis" and also the sub-leader of them. She was based on Miyu. She had the ability to tell the differences between truth and lies. She was imprisoned by Lightning, until Earth broke her out. When Shepard was about to kill her, Blue Gal rescued her, and told her about Miyu. She teamed up with Blue Maiden in the fight against Lightning. After Playmaker's second duel with The Gore, Ai retrieved G Golem's Crystal Heart and gave it back to her. She gave her deck to Skye. She along with Earth were absorbed by Bohman. After Bohman was defeated, she was erased.

He was one of the six Ignis, the "Light Ignis" and also the leader of them. He was based on Jin Kolter. He was cool and calm, but too smart so no one knew what he was thinking at all. He was the series' central antagonist; for being responsible for destroying the Cyberse World which started the events of the show, because it was to clarify all problems so things can progress, and he worked alongside Windy, until he incinerated him for losing to Soulburner. He imprisoned Aqua until Earth saved her, manipulated Windy, used him as a pawn, traumatized Jin, and infected both Dr. Kogami and Miyu with computer viruses. Queen shared his goals to create a high performance Ignis. After his duel with Varis, he was absorbed by Bohman. After Bohman was defeated, he was erased. He uses an Armatos Legio deck that is heavily focused on swarming the field.

Mirror LINK VRAINS

He was a third generation AI created by Lightning as a vessel to unify all of the Ignis into one perfect body. In Season 2, he served as a secondary antagonist, stealing Jin's consciousness. He became the main antagonist after Lightning’s death. He uses a Hydradrive deck focused on anti-Attribute tactics, and can use Storm Access. He absorbed Flame, Windy, Earth, Aqua and Lightning, and he erased Blue Maiden, Soulburner and Jin Kolter. In his 4th duel with Playmaker, he can use Master Storm Access, after being defeated by Playmaker, he was erased.

He was a second generation of AI created by Lightning. After being defeated by Blue Maiden, he was erased. He uses a Hydradrive deck.

Voiced by: Kento Fujinuma (Japanese); Billy Bob Thompson (English)
It was a first generation of AI created by Lightning. It can combine with Boot into a single Avatar capable of using two Skills. It uses a D-Scale deck.

It was a first generation of AI created by Lightning. It can combine with Bit into a single Avatar capable of using two Skills. It uses a D-Scale deck.

References

VRAINS Characters
Yu-Gi-Oh VRAINS